Recoba may refer to:

 Álvaro Recoba (1976), Uruguayan footballer
 Emilio Recoba (1904–1992), Uruguayan footballer